The Wacky World of Tex Avery (French: Le Monde Fou de Tex Avery)  is a short-lived animated television series created by Robby London and co-produced by DIC Productions, L.P., Les Studios Tex SARL, Milimetros, M6 and Telcima.

Both the series and the titular character were named after Tex Avery, a cartoonist who is known for his work at Warner Bros. and MGM. The creator describes the show as "homage to the brilliant, hilarious and groundbreaking animator Tex Avery and the wonderful squash-and-stretch cartoons of his era". The series was first broadcast on French channel M6 on September 3, 1997, followed on by its broadcast in the United States on September 29, through syndication, until it ended on December 26 the same year, due to poor ratings and reviews. In following years, The Wacky World of Tex Avery was overwhelmingly panned for it being an "insult" to Tex Avery's legacy, along with its animation, crude humor, voice acting, character designs and imagery, theme song, outdated stereotypes and characters.

Segment series
The series contains 7 segment series: The reason why the characters Tex Avery created weren't included was due to the fact that Tex Avery cartoons from WB and MGM are all owned by Turner Entertainment, then owned by Time Warner in 1996, and Universal's Tex Avery cartoons would still be owned by Universal Studios.

Tex Avery
This segment series centers on a cowboy named Tex Avery who saves the day and his love interest, Chastity Knott, from his nemesis, Sagebrush Sid. He was inspired by Bob Clampett's (a fellow animator at Termite Terrace in the 1930s) Red Hot Ryder character from Buckaroo Bugs. The theme song is "Home on the Range".

Pompeii Pete
Pete is a diminutive bumbling Roman centurion from Pompeii who was buried in lava from the eruption of Mount Vesuvius and two thousand years later breaks free from his preserved state in the modern world. His over-interpretive behavior constantly foil the schemes of sleazy conman, Dan. He was loosely inspired by Shorty from the Famous Studios era of Popeye the Sailor and Manuel from Fawlty Towers, borrowing some inspiration from Encino Man. The theme song is "Tarantella Napoletana".

Einstone
This segment series centers on a brilliant caveman, Ughbert Einstone, who is the world's first inventor. He tries to teach his friends how to be civilized through the use of his inventions. This segment is inspired by The First Bad Man, with Einstone's name being a play on Albert Einstein. The theme song is "If You're Happy and You Know It".

Genghis & Khannie
Genghis the lion is a warlord who leads his barbarian army across the world to conquer in the name of his emperor and often crosses paths with a female panda cub named Khannie who tends to thwart his plans through her innocent behavior. The duo's names are a play on Genghis Khan, while Genghis's design is based on the lion from Slap Happy Lion with his voice being modeled after Sean Connery and Khannie's mannerisms being influenced by Shirley Temple.

Freddy the Fly
A playful, obnoxious, and uncultured fly named Freddy bothers an obese, lazy and exceedingly short-tempered billionaire named Amanda Banshee, whose continuous excessive attempts to get rid of him often involve the most extreme of ways. Freddy was inspired by both one of Tex Avery's earlier characters, Homer the Homeless Flea and comedian Red Skelton's character, Freddy the Freeloader. Freddy and Banshee each have their own themes; Beethoven for Freddy and Vivaldi for Banshee.

Maurice & Mooch
This segment series centers on a young chicken named Maurice Squab who outwits Mooch, a fox constantly trying to eat him. Maurice's design is based on the canary from King-Size Canary, with his personality influenced by Junior Pig from One Ham's Family. Maurice speaks with a Swedish accent; Mooch has a New York accent, with a voice modelled on Jimmy Durante. The segment's theme is "Home! Sweet Home!".

Power Pooch
A normal dog gains superpowers after licking a superhero's shoe and becomes a superhero himself, albeit an incompetent one. Along with his cat sidekick, Little Buddy, Power Pooch fights the forces of evil, such as Doctor Hydrant and his henchman, Boney. This segment is inspired by W. Watts Biggers and Joe Harris' Underdog, as well as Doug TenNapel's Earthworm Jim.

Cast
 Billy West - Tex Avery, Sagebrush Sid, Freddy
 Kathleen Barr - Chastity Knott
 Ian James Corlett - Ughbert Einstone and Pompeii Pete
 Phil Hayes - Power Pooch
 Terry Klassen - Maurice Squab
 Maurice LaMarche - Mooch, The Emperor, Mr. Squab, The Narrator and Doctor Hydrant
 Scott McNeil - Amanda Banshee
 Cree Summer - Khannie 
 Lee Tockar - Genghis and Little Buddy
 Alec Willows - Dan

Episodes

Development
In October 1995, DIC Entertainment announced they would be opening an animation office in France in partnership with Hampster Productions (which at the time, was 33% minority-owned by DIC's majority owner Capital Cities/ABC), and that their first project would be called Tex Avery Theater. DIC also acquired the rights to use Avery's name and likeness through his estate in order to produce the series. The package of 195 7-minute cartoons would have been made available starting in October 1996. In March 1997, the studio was opened up and was named Les Studios Tex, which DIC was a shareholder, with DIC launching the show as The Wacky World of Tex Avery in syndication in the Fall of that year.

A logo of the studio that appears after the end credits of Archie's Weird Mysteries, shows a prototype design of Tex Avery that was scrapped, with a purple arc hat, while riding a horse. The same prototype design also appears in the French dub.

Home media releases and current-day syndication

France
In July 2003, TF1 Video through the TF! Video label released a 2-DVD boxset of the series, which contained 48 cartoons (24 cartoons each). Another boxset was released in January 2004, containing 64 cartoons (32 cartoons each).

In April 2011, AV Video released a boxset containing the first 24 episodes, with 72 cartoons all on the 3 DVDs.

United States
In 2003, Sterling Entertainment released three VHSs/DVDs of the series titled Power Pooch to the Rescue, Pompeii Pete in the 21st Century and Tex Rides Again, each containing nine cartoons from their respective segments. On the DVD versions, three bonus cartoons are featured with other characters from the show, like Freddy the Fly. The Tex Avery and Pompeii Pete DVDs were re-released in 2007 by NCircle Entertainment.

In February 2013, Mill Creek Entertainment released The Wacky World of Tex Avery- Volume 1 on DVD in Region 1 for the first time. The four-disc set features the first 40 episodes of the series and includes a bonus episode of Bump in the Night. It is unknown whether the rest of the episodes will be released on another DVD, as this DVD is currently out-of-print.

The show was originally available on Hulu, but has since been taken down, and is now only on Tubi and Vudu.

International
In Italy, the show was shown to Mediaset from 1999.

Later syndication
After the show's run on M6 in France, the show re-aired on Télétoon In March 2002, and on Canal+ Family and Gulli in 2008 and 2010, respectively.

In the United States, it aired in reruns on most Fox and UPN stations from 1997 to 2000 under the Bohbot Kids Network, and was brought back in reruns on the DiC Kids Network in 2003 (also on most Fox and UPN stations) up until 2004. In 2010, the program re-aired in the United States for the first time in a decade, where it was a part of the weekday morning Cookie Jar Toons programming block on the digital subchannel This TV. The show was removed from the lineup on September 26, 2011. Most episodes of the show were also available on Hulu and Jaroo.com. These prints plaster the DIC logo with the 2008 Cookie Jar logo. As of 2022, episodes 1-52 are available on Tubi.

Reception
The Wacky World of Tex Avery has been critically panned for its animation and humor. David Perlmutter in his book Encyclopedia of American Animated Television Shows described the show as an "insult" to the titular cartoonist, writing that it lacked the masterful way Avery himself employed and often transcended the limits of his material.

See also
 The Tex Avery Show

References

External links
 
 
 The Wacky World of Tex Avery on RetroJunk

1990s American animated television series
1990s American anthology television series
1990s French animated television series
1997 American television series debuts
1997 American television series endings
1997 French television series debuts
1997 French television series endings
American children's animated anthology television series
American children's animated comedy television series
French children's animated anthology television series
French children's animated comedy television series
First-run syndicated television programs in the United States
English-language television shows
French-language television shows
Tex Avery
Television series by DIC Entertainment
Bohbot Kids Network
Television series about cavemen